The 2021 Adur District Council elections took place on 6 May 2021 to elect members of Adur District Council in West Sussex, England. Half of the council was up for election, and the Conservative Party remained in overall control of the council.

These seats were due to be contested in 2020 but were delayed by one year due to the COVID-19 pandemic. This election was held concurrently with other elections across the United Kingdom.

Results

Ward results
Incumbent councillors are denoted by an asterisk (*)

Buckingham

Churchill

The second seat up for election in this ward was not due to be contested until 2022, but took place due to a vacancy arising.

Cokeham

Eastbrook

The second seat up for election in this ward was not due to be contested until 2022, but took place due to a vacancy arising.

Hillside

Manor

Marine

Mash Barn

Peverel

Southlands

 
 
 
 

The second seat up for election in this ward was not due to be contested until 2022, but took place due to a vacancy arising.

Southwick Green

St. Mary's

St. Nicolas

Widewater

By-elections

Hillside

References

Adur
2021
2020s in West Sussex